Igor Žabić (born 15 August 1992) is a Slovenian handball player for Kadetten Schaffhausen and the Slovenian national team.

He represented Slovenia at the 2018 European Men's Handball Championship.

References

External links

1992 births
Living people
Sportspeople from Celje
Slovenian male handball players
Expatriate handball players in Poland
Slovenian expatriate sportspeople in Poland
Slovenian expatriate sportspeople in Hungary
Slovenian expatriate sportspeople in Portugal
Slovenian expatriate sportspeople in France
Wisła Płock (handball) players
Sporting CP handball players
Competitors at the 2018 Mediterranean Games
Mediterranean Games competitors for Slovenia
Slovenian people of Serbian descent
21st-century Slovenian people